The men's javelin throw at the 2016 European Athletics Championships took place at the Olympic stadium for the finals and at the Museumplein for qualifying on 6 and 7 July.

Records

Schedule

Results

Qualification

Qualification: 81.50 m (Q) or best 12 performers (q)

Final

References

Javelin Throw
Javelin throw at the European Athletics Championships